Medingen Abbey or Medingen Convent is a former Cistercian nunnery. Today it is a residence for women of the Protestant Lutheran faith near the Lower Saxon town of Bad Bevensen and is supervised by the Monastic Chamber of Hanover (Klosterkammer Hannover). The current director of the abbey (Äbtissin) is the art historian Dr Kristin Püttmann.

History 

A founding legend ascribes the convent's origins to a lay brother called Johannes; the convent's history from its founding to the election of abbess Margaretha Puffen was formerly depicted in a cycle of 15 painted wooden boards, that were destroyed in the fire of 1781; the only surviving copy is the affix in Johann Ludolf Lyßman's Historische Nachrichten (1772). The legend has it that Johannes claimed divine guidance in his quest to build the new convent. The community was founded 1228 in Restorf am Höhbeck by Johannes and four nuns who joined him in Magdeburg, but the group did not stay there. For unknown reasons, they moved on to Plate near Lüchow and later Bohndorf, before they eventually settled in Altenmedingen, where the first buildings were consecrated on 24 August 1241.

The military road passing through the convent yard presented an ever-present danger of attacks or arson, so the convent decided to move one last time, to the village of Zellensen, today's Medingen. The new church was consecrated on 24 August 1336.

1479 saw the advent of the convent reforms under the influence of the devotio moderna. Many convents at that time did not follow the Cistercian rule very strictly; nuns were allowed to keep their belongings and keep in touch with their relatives once they joined the convent. The Cistercian order was re-established and the prioress Margarete Puffen was made an abbess in 1494.
After the reforms, a scriptorium became one of the focal points of the convent and to this day a large number of manuscripts found worldwide can be attributed to the sixteenth-century nuns of Medingen. Hymns (Leisen) noted down in these texts are still part of both Catholic and Protestant hymnbooks today, e.g. in the current German Protestant hymnal  EG 23 "Gelobet seist du, Jesu Christ", EG 100 "Wir wollen alle fröhlich sein" and EG 214 "Gott sei gelobet und gebenedeiet", even though they were wrongly dated to the 14th century by the music historian Walther Lipphardt.

The Reformation attempted to be introduced in Medingen in 1524, was met with resistance from the nuns. They hid their confessor in the attic, publicly burned the Lutheran bible and almost faced the dissolution of the convent. In 1541, the Uelzen Landtag decided to ensure the economic security of Medingen and the five other convents nearby. This was in the nobility's interests, because their unmarried daughters could benefit from the livelihood and education befitting their status. In 1542, all of the convent's goods and earnings were confiscated and contact between the nuns and their family was prohibited. The abbess, Margareta von Stöterogge, did not give in to the demands of bringing all remaining property to Celle, but rather went to Hildesheim for two years, taking the convent's archive and valuables with her. It took her brother, Nikolaus von Stöterogge, to convince her finally to accept the communion under both forms. Eventually, in 1554, the convent became Protestant and from then on, the Klosterordnung (convent order) was defined by the Landesherr  or territorial lord.

After the Reformation had been introduced, life changed drastically: The incumbents were now allowed to marry, but had to leave the convent when they did so. In 1605, they replaced the traditional Cistercian habit with an attire in accordance with the convent order introduced by Duke William in 1574. The Thirty Years' War left its mark on the convent and its surrounding area. A new convent order was introduced by Kurfürst (elector) George Louis in 1706.

Most of the convent buildings were destroyed in a fire in January 1781, although valuable possessions like the archives and the abbesses' crosier from 1494 were able to be salvaged. The ruins were demolished in 1782 and the convent re-built in the early neoclassic style. Completed in 1788, the new buildings were consecrated on 24 August.

List of heads of convent

Cultural heritage
A large number of medieval manuscripts were produced in Medingen, 44 of which have survived and are conserved all over the world. The nuns enhanced the liturgy written in Latin with Low German prayers and songs, producing unique compilations of illuminated texts that were important to them as well as the noblewomen in the surrounding areas.

Furthermore, the brewery, built in 1397, survived the fire of 1781 and can still be seen today. It attests to the fact that the convent was originally built in the Brick Gothic style.

References

Further reading
Achten, Gerard: De Gebedenboeken van de Cistercienserinnenkloosters Medingen en Wienhausen, in: Miscellanea Neerlandica 3 (= FS Jan Deschamps), 1987, pp. 173–188.
Brohmann, Friedrich: Geschichte von Bevensen und Kloster Medingen, 1928.
Hascher-Burger, Ulrike / Lähnemann, Henrike: Liturgie und Reform in Kloster Medingen. Edition und Untersuchung des Propst-Handbuchs Oxford, Bodleian Library, MS. Lat. liturg. e. 18 (Spätmittelalter und Reformation. Neue Reihe), Tübingen: Mohr Siebeck, 2013 (in press).
Heutger, Nicolaus Carl: Kloster Medingen in der Lüneburger Heide, in: 'Cistercienser Chronik.' Forum für Geschichte, Kunst, Literatur und Spiritualität des Mönchtums, Vol. 101 (1994), pp. 15–18
Homeyer, Joachim: 750 Jahre Kloster Medingen. Kleine Beiträge zur frühen Klostergeschichte. (Schriften zur Uelzener Heimatkunde, hg. v. Hans E. Seidat, H. 3), Uelzen, 1978.
Homeyer, Joachim: Kloster Medingen, die Gründungslegende und ihre historischen Elemente, in: Jahrbuch der Gesellschaft für niedersächsische Kirchengeschichte 79 (1981), pp. 9–60.
Homeyer, Joachim (Hg.): Kloster Medingen 1788 – 1988, 200 Jahre Neubau. Kleine Beiträge zum Jubiläum. Uelzen, 1988
Homeyer, Joachim: Urkundenbuch des Klosters Medingen. Hahn, Hannover 2006, .
Homeyer, Joachim: 500 Jahre Äbtissinnen in Medingen (Schriften zur Uelzener Heimatkunde, hg.v. von Horst Hoffmann, H. 11), Uelzen, 1994.
Krüger, Nilüfer: Niederdeutsches Osterorationale aus Medingen, in: FS für Horst Gronemeyer zum 60. Geburtstag, hg.v. Herald Weigel, Herzberg, 1993, pp. 179–201.
Lähnemann, Henrike: An dessen bom wil ik stighen. Die Ikonographie des Wichmannsburger Antependiums im Kontext der Medinger Handschriften, in: Oxford German Studies 34 (2005), pp. 19–46.
Lähnemann, Henrike/ Linden, Sandra: Per organa. Musikalische Unterweisung in Handschriften der Lüneburger Klöster, in: Dichtung und Didaxe. Lehrhaftes Sprechen in der deutschen Literatur des Mittelalters, Berlin/New York, 2009, p. 397-412.
Lähnemann, Henrike: Die Erscheinungen Christi nach Ostern in Medinger Handschriften, in: Medialität des Heils im späten Mittelalter, ed. by Carla Dauven-van Knippenberg, Cornelia Herberichs, and Christian Kiening, Chronos, 2009 (Medienwandel – Medienwechsel – Medienwissen 10), pp. 189–202.
Lähnemann, Henrike: Schnipsel, Schleier, Textkombinatorik. Die Materialität der Medinger Orationalien, in: Materialität in der Editionswissenschaft, ed. by Martin Schubert, Tübingen, 2010 (Beihefte zu editio), pp. 135–146.
Lyßmann, Johann Ludolf, gewesenen Predigers zu Closter Meding, und nachherigen Superintendenten zu Fallersleben: Historische Nachricht von dem Ursprunge, Anwachs und Schicksalen des im Lüneburgischen Herzogthum belegenen Closters Meding, dessen Pröbsten, Priorinnen und Abbatißinnen, auch fürnehmsten Gebräuchen und Lutherischen Predigern &c. nebst darzu gehörigen Urkunden und Anmerkungen bis auf das Jahr 1769 fortgesetzt. Mit Kupfern. Halle, 1772. (Digital version)
Stork, Hans-Walter: Die mittelalterlichen Handschriften des ehemaligen Zisterzienserinnenklosters Medingen zur Zeit der Klosterreform im 15. Jahrhundert und in nachreformatorischer Zeit., in: Otte, Hans (ed.): Evangelisches Klosterleben. Studien zur Geschichte der evangelischen Klöster und Stifte in Niedersachsen, Göttingen 2013, pp. 337 – 360.
Vogtherr, Thomas: Medingen, in: Dolle, Josef (ed.): Niedersächsisches Klosterbuch. Verzeichnis der Klöster, Stifte, Kommenden und Beginenhäuser in Niedersachsen und Bremen von den Anfängen bis 1810. Marienthal bis Zeven (Vol. 3), Bielefeld 2012, pp. 1044–1050.
Wehking, Sabine: Die Inschriften der Lüneburger Klöster. Ebstorf, Isenhagen, Lüne, Medingen, Walsrode, Wienhausen (Die Deutschen Inschriften 76 = Die deutschen Inschriften: Göttinger Reihe 13) Wiesbaden 2009.

External links

Website of the Convent
Article on Medingen on the Bad Bevensen website
Article on Medingen on the Historisches Bevensen e.V. website (Historical Bevensen Association)
Artikle on Medingen on the Lüneburg Heath website
Article on Medingen on the NDR website
on the Medingen Manuscripts and extensive bibliography
Blog entry on a Medingen manuscript now in the Bodleian Library of the University of Oxford

Brick Gothic
Christian monasteries established in the 13th century
Cistercian monasteries in Germany
Lüneburg Heath
Lutheran women's convents
Monasteries in Lower Saxony
Neoclassicism

de:Medingen (Bad Bevensen)